Solar power in Missouri has been a growing industry since the early 2010s. Solar power is capable of generating 42.7% of the electricity used in Missouri from rooftop solar panels totaling 28,300 MW.

Net metering is available only during a billing period. Excess generation is credited at avoided cost rate, and lost if any remains after a year, giving the state a B rating.

IKEA installed a 1.28-MW solar array on its St. Louis store which was the largest rooftop installation in the state. It was completed in July 2015.

Missouri's largest solar farm is located in Christian County, just outside of Nixa on a plot owned by Gardener Capital. The farm generates 9% of the power needs of Nixa, Missouri transmission grid.

Statistics

See also

Wind power in Missouri
Solar power in the United States
Renewable energy in the United States

References

External links

Missouri Department of Natural Resources
Missouri Incentives and Policies
Missouri Solar Energy Industry Association

Missouri
Energy in Missouri